Inga macrantha is a species of plant in the family Fabaceae. It is found only in Venezuela.

References

macrantha
Endemic flora of Venezuela
Vulnerable flora of South America
Taxonomy articles created by Polbot